Church of the Mother of God, Holy Mother of God Church, Church of the Theotokos, or similar, may refer to:

Armenia 
 Holy Mother of God Church, Vagharshapat
 Holy Mother of God Church, Voskepar
 Holy Mother of God Church, Yeghvard
 Surp Astvatsatsin Church of Karbi
 Zoravor Surp Astvatsatsin Church, Yerevan

Bulgaria 
 Church of the Holy Mother of God, Boboshevo
 Church of the Holy Mother of God, Panagyurishte
 Church of the Holy Mother of God, Plovdiv

Georgia 
 Areni Church
 Holy Mother of God Church of Bethlehem, Tbilisi

Iran 
 Church of the Holy Mother of God, Darashamb
 Holy Mother of God Church, Tehran

Serbia 
 Church of the Holy Mother of God, Kuršumlija
 Church of the Holy Mother of God, Selačka

Syria 
 Church of the Holy Mother of God, Aleppo

Turkey 
 Church of the Theotokos at Lips (Constantinople), now the Fenari Isa Mosque, Istanbul

See also
 St. Mary's Church (disambiguation)
 Dormition of the Theotokos Church (disambiguation)
 Church of the Nativity of the Theotokos (disambiguation)
 Holy Mother of God Cathedral (disambiguation)
 Monastery of Holy Mother of God (disambiguation)